Dourtenga is a small town in the Dourtenga Department of Balé Province in southern Burkina Faso. It is the capital of the Dourtenga Department and the town has a total population of 3,276.

Climate
Köppen-Geiger climate classification system classifies its climate as hot semi-arid (BSh) and closely borders with tropical wet and dry (Aw).

References

External links
Satellite map at Maplandia.com

Populated places in the Centre-Est Region
Koulpélogo Province